Jan Madaliński, O. Cist. (1589-1644) was a Roman Catholic prelate who served as  Auxiliary Bishop of Gniezno (1640–1644).

Biography
Jan Madaliński was born in 1589 and ordained a priest in the Cistercian Order. On 16 Apr 1640, he was appointed during the papacy of Pope Urban VIII as Auxiliary Bishop of Gniezno and Titular Bishop of Teodosia. He served as Auxiliary Bishop of Gniezno until his death in 1644. While bishop, he was the principal co-consecrator of Piotr Mieszkowski, Auxiliary Bishop of Włocławek (1643).

References 

17th-century Roman Catholic bishops in the Polish–Lithuanian Commonwealth
Bishops appointed by Pope Urban VIII
1589 births
1644 deaths
Cistercian bishops